Gunter Silva (born 1977) is a Peruvian writer.

Biography

Gunter Silva Passuni was born in 1977 in La Merced, Peru.

He studied Law at the Catholic University of Santa María in Arequipa. He also holds an MA in Literature and Creative Writing awarded by the University of Westminster. He published his first short stories collection, Crónicas de Londres (The London Chronicles) in 2012, and in 2016 his second book Pasos Pesados (One Step Beyond), a novel about a young protagonist called Tiago E. Molina and his turbulent life in Peru during the armed conflict, the setting is the city of Lima at the end of the 80's and the beginning of the 90's. Carlos Fonseca Suárez describes the novel as “the epic of another lost generation that matures in the midst of a ruined and violent homeland”.<ref>Carlos Fonseca Suárez, August 2016, “‘Pasos pesados’: una generación cautiva en Perú Pesados: Una Generación Cautiva en Perú}".‘'FronteraD (accessed 30 June 2019)</ref> The book was warmly received by the critics, and in 2017 it won a grant from the Danish Arts Foundation, and was translated into Danish as ‘Tiagos overdrevne og vildfarne eventyr’.

He has been invited, among others, to the London Book Fair, Ricardo Palma International Book Fair, Guadalajara, Festival Literatura Copenhagen., and to the First International Conference of Contemporary Peruvian Writers ‘Palabras Fuera de Lugar’ at Milan in 2017, organised by the Peruvian Consulate and the University of Milan.

His short story “Herford”, won the World Literature Today Translation Prize in 2019.

 Work 

 Books 

’'''Crónicas de Londres. 'The London Chronicle' (Lima: Atalaya Editores, 2012)   
’Pasos Pesados. 'One Step Beyond' (Lima: Fondo Editorial Universitario, UCV, 2016) .
’’El Baile de los Vencidos. 'The Dance of the Defeated' (Buenos Aires: equidistancias, 2022)   

 Anthologies 

 Beings, Contemporary Peruvian Short Stories (London, Berforts Press) 
 The Peruvian Short Story, XXI Century (Copenhagen, Aurora Boreal press, No. 17, 2015).
 Lejos. Sedici racconti dal Perú (Roma, Gran Vía Edizioni) 
 ‘'Paciencia Perdida. An Anthology of Peruvian Fiction’ Ed. professor Gabriel T. Saxton (Dallas, USA. Dulzorada Press,2022) 
 ‘'La Bruñida Caoba Entre Dos Espejos: Latinoamérica y Escandinavia’’  Eds. professors Jensen, J & Moreno, A (México, Fondo Editorial de la Universidad de Chihuahua, 2022)

See also 
 Peruvian literature
Julio Ramón Ribeyro
Alonso Cueto
Daniel Alarcón
Carlos Yushimito
Santiago Roncagliolo

References

External links 

  “Interview to Gunter Silva about Pasos Pesados” La República, peruvian newspaper
 “interview to Gunter Silva about Crónicas de Londres” Ojo en Tinta, chilean literary journal

Peruvian novelists
1977 births
Living people
Alumni of the University of Westminster
Catholic University of Santa María alumni
People from Junín Region